Enea di Cesare Spennazzi (died 1658) was a Roman Catholic prelate who served as Bishop of Ferentino (1644–1658) and Bishop of Sovana (1638–1644).

Biography
On 20 December 1638, Enea di Cesare Spennazzi was appointed Bishop of Sovana by Pope Urban VIII.
On 21 December 1638, he was consecrated bishop by Alessandro Cesarini (iuniore), Cardinal-Deacon of Sant'Eustachio, with Tommaso Carafa, Bishop Emeritus of Vulturara e Montecorvino, and Giovanni Battista Altieri, Bishop Emeritus of Camerino, serving as co-consecrators.

On 23 May 1644, he was transferred to the diocese of Ferentino by Pope Urban VIII.
He served as Bishop of Ferentino until his death in 1658.

Episcopal succession
While bishop, he was the principal co-consecrator of:
Franciscus Perrone, Bishop of Caiazzo (1648); 
Francesco Antonio Roberti, Bishop of Alessano (1648); 
Pirro Luigi Castellomata, Bishop of Ascoli Satriano (1648); 
Agostino Barbosa, Bishop of Ugento (1649); 
Giovanni Antonio Capobianco, Bishop of Siracusa (1649); 
Paolo Teutonico, Archbishop of Manfredonia (1649); and
Gian Giacomo Cristoforo, Bishop of Lacedonia (1649).

References

External links and additional sources
 (for Chronology of Bishops) 
 (for Chronology of Bishops) 
 (for Chronology of Bishops) 
 (for Chronology of Bishops) 

17th-century Italian Roman Catholic bishops
Bishops appointed by Pope Urban VIII
1658 deaths